The Senate Committee on Accountability of Public Officers and Investigations of the Senate of the Philippines, or more popularly known as the Blue Ribbon Committee, is the Senate committee tasked to investigate alleged wrongdoings of the government, its officials, and its attached agencies, including government owned and controlled corporations, in aid of legislation, that is, the primary purpose is the suggestion of new laws, or proposals of amendments to existing laws.

Like all other committees, the Senate elects members of the Blue Ribbon Committee. The chairmanship of the committee has been one of the most sought posts in the Senate, aside from the Senate Presidency.

History
Cavite Representative Justiniano Montano of the Liberal Party, who was successfully included in the Liberal's 1949 Senate election ticket, supported Jose T. Cajulis of the Nacionalista Party in the elections to the House of Representatives seat he was retiring from. While the Liberals' candidate easily defeated Cajulis, Montano won in the Senate election; he formed a clique called "The Little Senate" with like-minded Liberal senators and began to attack President Elpidio Quirino (who was also from the Liberal Party)'s presidency. Montano then created the Blue Ribbon Committee, taking the name from other blue ribbon committees, with the mandate to investigate alleged irregularities from the executive branch.

Thereafter, the Blue Ribbon Committee has become the most powerful Congressional committee, investigating alleged criminal misconduct by government officials in aid of legislation. However, the committee cannot incarcerate witnesses and resource persons, except in cases of contempt of Congress.

However, the Senate has adopted rules to limit the abuse of this power. These include that all investigations should be "in aid of legislation", the right against self-incrimination should not be violated, the right to counsel should be respected, rules of procedures should be published and persons concerned should be informed of the rules, and the investigation shall serve a not serve as member's personal aggrandizement.

Controversies and scandals investigated
Under the presidency of Fidel V. Ramos:

 PEA Amari scam (1995)

Under the presidency of Joseph Estrada:

 Expo Filipino scam (1998)
 Juetengate scandal (2000)

Under the presidency of Gloria Macapagal-Arroyo:

 PIATCO NAIA Terminal 3 scam (2002)
Macapagal Boulevard scam (2003)
Fertilizer Fund scam (2004)
 Hello Garci scandal (2005)
 NBN–ZTE deal corruption scandal (2007)
 Euro Generals scandal (2008)

Under the presidency of Benigno Aquino III:

 2011 Armed Forces of the Philippines corruption scandal (2011)
 Priority Development Assistance Fund scam (2013)
 Jejomar Binay's alleged corruption (2014–2015)
 Bangladesh Bank robbery (2016)

During the presidency of Rodrigo Duterte:

 2016 Bureau of Immigration bribery scandal (2016)
 2017 Bureau of Customs drug smuggling scandal (2017)
 Dengvaxia controversy (2017)
 DOT–PTV tourism advertisement controversy (2018)
 2018 Bureau of Customs drug smuggling scandal (2018)
 Good Conduct Time Allowance and Ninja cops controversies (2019)
Philippine Health Insurance Corporation corruption scandals (2020–21)
 Pharmally contract deal controversy (2021–22)

During the presidency of Bongbong Marcos:

 2022 Philippine sugar crisis (2022-ongoing)

Jurisdiction 
According to the Rules of the Senate, the Blue Ribbon Committee handles all matters relating to the following:

 Investigation of malfeasance, misfeasance and nonfeasance in office by officers and employees of the government, its branches, agencies, subdivisions and instrumentalities
 Implementation of the provision of the Constitution on nepotism
 Investigation of any matter of public interest on its own initiative or brought to its attention by any member of the Senate

Members, 19th Congress
The Senate Blue Ribbon Committee has 17 members in the 19th Congress, as of September 28, 2022.

The President Pro Tempore, the Majority Floor Leader, and the Minority Floor Leader are ex officio members.

Ex officio members:
Senate President pro tempore Loren Legarda
Majority Floor Leader Joel Villanueva
Minority Floor Leader Koko Pimentel
Committee secretary: Atty. Rodolfo Noel S. Quimbo

List of chairpersons

References

See also 

 Blue-ribbon committee

Accountability
Public inquiries